Robin Cook (1946–2005) was a British politician.

Robin Cook may also refer to:

 Robin Cook (American novelist) (born 1940)
 Derek Raymond (1931–1994), British novelist, born Robert William Arthur Cook, whose first books were published under the name Robin Cook
 Jonas Ekfeldt, or Robin Cook, Swedish music producer and singer

See also
Robin Cooke, Baron Cooke of Thorndon (1926–2006), New Zealand judge